Three's a Crowd (also known as 3's a Crowd) is an American game show originally packaged by Chuck Barris Productions. The first version aired in syndication from September 17, 1979 to February 1, 1980. The second version ran in 1999 on Game Show Network.

Syndicated version
Hosted by Jim Peck, this version's tagline was "Who knows a man better, his wife or his secretary?" It bore many similarities to Barris' The Newlywed Game. Three sets of husband-wife-secretary teams appeared, and the game started with the men answering three pointed questions, usually referencing their wives and secretaries in ways that would lead to potential marital discord.

The secretaries then were brought back to answer the same questions, followed by the wives. Whichever team — wives or secretaries — matched the men's answers more often equally split a $1,000 prize (if both teams were tied, all parties split $500). The men received an announced prize for their participation.

Broadcast history
According to Barris in his first autobiography, The Game Show King, the protests against the show—as well as the sometimes-evident lack of fun the contestants seemed to be having on it—prompted him to retreat from television production entirely.

At the time, Barris's company had four other shows on the air: revivals of both The Dating Game and The Newlywed Game, the still-running syndicated The Gong Show and its spin-off The $1.98 Beauty Show. Barris wrote that "The public backlash from Three's a Crowd not only caused the program to be canceled, but it took three other TV shows of mine with it. I went to my house in Malibu and stayed there for a year." Indeed, it was largely due to the backlash from Three's a Crowd that ratings for all of his other shows—including the still-popular The Gong Show—plummeted and were removed from the air by the start of the next television season.

The series was replaced on February 4, 1980, by a revival of the 1960s game show Camouflage, also produced by Barris. Unlike its predecessor, Camouflage was a weekly series – something that worked against it, as the weekly syndicated game show had largely gone by the wayside in favor of daily "strips" (the only other game shows not produced by Barris at this time that were still airing weekly were The Nighttime Price Is Right, which was wrapping up its final season, and Match Game PM and Joker! Joker! Joker!, both of which ran until 1981). Three's A Crowd was the last original format Barris tried; the rest of his productions were either revivals of old shows (as Camouflage and a second Barris revival of Treasure Hunt were) or his previous efforts (The Dating Game, The Newlywed Game, and The Gong Show were all revived during the 1980s).

Barris would spend the next several years holed up at home, where he would use his spare time to write a mock biography, Confessions of a Dangerous Mind, in which Barris imagined himself as an assassin for the Central Intelligence Agency during his game show career (Barris had applied for work with the CIA but abandoned that career path before entering when he broke into television). Confessions of a Dangerous Mind would later be adapted into a 2002 film of the same name.

GSN version
This version was hosted by Alan Thicke. GSN defused its remake, produced by sister company Columbia TriStar Television, markedly. The wives-secretaries pairings were replaced by pairings such as girlfriend-best friend, girlfriend-mother and such. Just as often, a woman would be the central subject with the pairings altered appropriately.

Round 1
As in the original, the middle people were asked three questions about their significant others. The significant others were asked the same questions when they returned altogether. Each time they or either one match, they get 5 points.

Round 2
The tables were turned as the significant others were asked three questions about their mate. The middle people were asked the same questions when they returned altogether. Each time either one or both significant others match, they get 10 points.

Round 3: Fast Match Round
Each middle person was given four words/phrases that may or may not relate to them. They must answer with one of three possible choices such as, "Be There", "Wouldn't Dare", "No Fair"; "I Win", "I Lose", "It's a Draw" etc. (so, in other words, choice A would be a "Yes" answer, choice B would be a "No" answer, and choice C would be a "Maybe" answer) Before they answer, each significant other must lock in their predictions to how their mates will answer. Once again each match is worth 10 points. For a possible grand total of 85 points.

Originally, the middle person makes the choice of an answer after locking in their answer; in Season 2 the person now holds the card (like in the first round) to show the answer after they locked it in.

Unlike the original, the significant others don't work as a team. The significant other with the most points at show's end won $1,000; sudden-death was played if there was a tie. The central characters, as before, received an unannounced prize for participating.

Episode Status
Most, if not all, of the original series is intact. GSN reran many episodes, including two pilots from 1978 and a third from 1979. The pilots are distinguishable from the rest of the series through a somewhat different set (a brown backdrop with green stripes behind the contestants, plus Peck's podium having a large "3" as the backdrop) and Peck himself not having the perm he sported during the series.

All episodes exist of the GSN revival.

Critical reception
In his book What Were They Thinking?: The 100 Dumbest Events in Television History, David Hofstede ranks the show at number 94. He wrote that it "offered the chance to watch a marriage dissolve on camera years before Jerry Springer", and noted that it received backlash from the United Auto Workers (UAW) and National Organization for Women (NOW).

References

1970s American game shows
1980s American game shows
1979 American television series debuts
1980 American television series endings
1990s American game shows
2000s American game shows
1999 American television series debuts
2000 American television series endings
Game Show Network original programming
First-run syndicated television programs in the United States
Television series by Sony Pictures Television
Television series by Barris Industries
Television series created by Chuck Barris
American television series revived after cancellation